This is a timeline of incidents in 2010 that have been labelled, or investigated as possible cases of "terrorism" and are not believed to have been carried out by a government or its forces (see state terrorism and state-sponsored terrorism).

List guidelines
 To be included, entries must be notable (have a stand-alone article) and described by a consensus of reliable sources as "terrorism".
 List entries must comply with the guidelines outlined in the manual of style under MOS:TERRORIST.
 Casualty figures in this list are the total casualties of the incident, including immediate casualties and later casualties (such as people who succumbed to their wounds long after the attacks occurred).
Casualties listed are the victims. Perpetrator casualties are listed separately (e.g. x (+y) indicate that x victims and y perpetrators were killed/injured).
Casualty totals may be underestimated or unavailable due to a lack of information. A figure with a plus (+) sign indicates that at least that many people have died (e.g. 10+ indicates that at least 10 people have died) – the actual toll could be considerably higher.
 If casualty figures are 20 or more, they will be shown in bold. In addition, figures for casualties more than 50 will also be underlined.

January

Total incidents:

February

Total incidents:

March

Total incidents:

April

Total incidents:

May

Total incidents:

July

Total incidents:

August

Total incidents:

September

Total incidents:

October

Total incidents:

November

Total incidents: 1

December

Total incidents:

See also
List of Palestinian rocket attacks on Israel, 2010
List of suicide bombings in Iraq in 2010
List of terrorist incidents by death toll
List of Islamist terrorist attacks in 2010

References

 
 2010
 
 
 2010
Terr
Lists of terrorist incidents in 2010